The 1970 United States Senate election in Massachusetts was held on November 3, 1970. The incumbent Democratic Senator Ted Kennedy defeated his challengers.  This was Kennedy's first election run since the 1969 Chappaquiddick incident.
Kennedy won 62.2% of the vote, down from the 74.3% that he won in the previous election in 1964, indicating that Chappaquiddick did affect his popularity.

This was the last election in which Ted Kennedy lost any Massachusetts county. Spaulding carried Barnstable, Dukes, Franklin, and Nantucket Counties.

Republican primary

Candidates
 Josiah Spaulding, businessman
John J. McCarthy, Commissioner of Administration and Finance

Results

General election

Candidates
 Ted Kennedy, incumbent U.S. Senator since 1962 (Democratic)
 Lawrence Gilfedder (Socialist Labor)
 Mark R. Shaw, perennial candidate and Prohibition nominee for Vice President in 1964 (Prohibition)
 Josiah Spaulding, businessman (Republican)

Results

See also 
 United States Senate elections, 1970

External links
 Race details at ourcampaigns.com

References

1970
Massachusetts
United States Senate